Star Ocean: Till the End of Time is an action role-playing game, the third main game in the Star Ocean series. The game was developed by tri-Ace and published by Square Enix for the PlayStation 2 console. It was released in Japan, North America, and the PAL territories. The original Japanese release date was in February 2003 by Enix, its penultimate release before its merger to become Square Enix. It was re-released in 2004 as a two-disc Director's Cut version with bonus features such as new characters and dungeons. The North American and European versions are based on the Director's Cut version with Ubisoft handling publishing rights in Europe. Till the End of Time takes place four hundred years after the events of Star Ocean: The Second Story.

Gameplay
While having many similarities to its predecessor, Star Ocean: Till the End of Time includes many elements that make it unique among the majority of role-playing video games. Instead of menu-driven combat, Star Ocean 3 offers real-time interactive combat, similar to the .hack and Tales series. Battles occur when running into enemies on the main travel field or when certain pre-scripted events occur. In battle, the player directly controls one character, while the other two characters are controlled by AI. The player can, however, choose the tactics used by AI characters or switch which character they are directly controlling.

Enemy attacks can target either a player's hit points (HP) or mental points (MP). Players will also lose HP from using special attacks or lose MP from using symbology or runeology, which is functionally equivalent to magic in other games.  If a character loses all of their HP or, unlike most games, if they lose all of their MP, they are knocked out and unable to continue participation in the battle (unless certain revival items are used). Each character also has a Fury meter, which governs how fast the character moves over the battle screen, and how often actions can be performed. Standing still will replenish Fury, while any movement will continue to drain it or cause the character to lag. If all three characters are defeated, the game is over and the player must reload from their last saved game. If all the enemies are defeated, the player is awarded money (Fol) and experience points (EXP). When some groups of enemies are defeated, the player's characters can also receive a small amount of HP/MP, to counteract the HP/MP that was lost as a result of using special attacks or symbology/runeology.

When the player strikes an enemy, the Bonus Battle Gauge will fill. When the gauge reaches full capacity, the player will enter "Bonus Battle". In "Bonus Battle", the player receives special bonuses, which can help benefit a character's EXP, Fol, items received after battle, etc. However, if a character receives a critical hit, runs away from battle, or dies, the gauge will deplete completely, resulting in the end of "Bonus Battle" and any bonuses the player received. The Bonus Battle Gauge will also reset if the player turns the game off and turns it back on, or restarts their save file.

Like the previous games in the series, the game contains an Item Creation feature that allows the player to create and enhance a multitude of items. A variety of trades are offered, including Cookery, Alchemy, Engineering, and Smithery. Workshops for Item Creation are scattered throughout the towns and dungeons of the game and can be invested in by the player to allow a wider variety of items to be made there. Once a player invents an item, they can file for a patent, and get money from the profits made off selling those items in various shops. The player is also able to recruit inventors to aid them in creating various items.

The Director's Cut version added a VS. Mode to battle against a second player or against the computer. Up to two human players could compete, either against each other or against another character controlled by the computer. Another addition was the use of "Battle Trophies" which may be acquired by completing various challenges in combat. For example, a player can receive a battle trophy for winning a battle in under 30 seconds, or for defeating a boss without receiving damage. Earning battle trophies unlocks bonus options such as harder game difficulty levels, alternate costumes, and a sound test.

Story

Setting
The universe of Star Ocean is science fiction in nature, although like the first two games in the series, much of the plot is set on an "underdeveloped planet."  The game is set in S.D 772 (A.D 2858). It features a galaxy-spanning government in the Pangalactic Federation, several races and species of aliens, different factions, multiple colonized planets, and advanced technology. But despite this science fiction atmosphere, a form of magic exists in the universe: symbology, also translated as heraldry in the Japanese version and in Star Ocean: The Second Story. Standard symbology involves tattooing crests and runes onto one's flesh to draw out apparently latent power in the form of spells, and numerous underdeveloped planets make extensive use of it. Despite its supernatural connotations, Symbology is treated as a legitimate field of scientific study in-universe.

Plot
Star Ocean: Till the End of Time begins on the planet Hyda IV where a young man, Fayt Leingod, and his childhood friend, Sophia Esteed, are on vacation with Fayt's family. Fayt is the son of Robert Leingod, a famous scientist in the field of symbological genetics. For an unknown reason, the Vendeeni — an alien civilization with highly advanced technology that spans only a single planet — attacks Hyda IV unprovoked, thus initiating a war with the Pangalactic Federation. Fayt and Sophia escape on the starship Helre, but are separated from Fayt's parents, Robert and Ryoko Leingod. The Helre is also attacked by the Vendeeni, and the two are separated.

Fayt's escape pod lands on the "underdeveloped planet" Vanguard III, a planet with technology equivalent to 16th Century Earth, and discovers an off-world criminal, the exiled Rezerbian Norton, plotting to take it over. Cliff Fittir, a member of the anti-Federation organization Quark, then lands and helps Fayt defeat this criminal. Fayt learns that Quark's leader wishes to speak to him and plans on rescuing his father, though Cliff does not reveal the reason behind this interest. After getting off the planet with Cliff and meeting his assistant Mirage, the Vendeeni again attack them — but they escape and crash-land on another underdeveloped world, Elicoor II. Elicoor seems to be around 17th Century Earth in terms of technological advancement. Fayt, Cliff, and Mirage crash-land into the capital of the Kingdom of Airyglyph, who believe that their ship is a weapon developed by the country they are at war with, Aquaria. Fayt and Cliff are imprisoned as a result Mirage escapes, though they are soon rescued by an assassin-like agent, Nel Zelpher, who believes they are engineers from the technologically advanced continent of Greeton. She rescues them under the condition that they aid her country, Aquaria, with their technological knowledge or that she will kill them to prevent them leaking secrets to Airyglyph. This leads the two directly into the war between the two kingdoms and eventually into a great final battle between them. Then a new — at least to the Elicoorians — foe appears in the skies above, a Vendeeni battleship that has found their quarry. However, Fayt destroys the battleship with a previously unknown power of his, though another battleship remains in orbit. During the distraction, the leader of Quark, Maria Traydor, manages to arrive on Elicoor. It seems that both Quark and the Vendeeni knew of Fayt's unusual abilities, and he had been their target the whole time. The party vies with the Vendeeni over control of an unusual "out of place artifact" and Fayt's father, who is killed before Maria can finish interrogating him over his "crimes."

Fayt finds himself space-borne once more, and the galaxy has not stood still. Shortly after the apparently unprovoked attack on Hyda IV, a threat of destruct-full magnitude emerges in the form of ultra-powerful space-borne beings calling themselves "Executioners." The best ships of the Federation and the Vendeeni are nearly powerless against these new beings, and are quickly being forced into full retreat. The party, acting on a hint from Fayt's father, venture to the Moonbase research station, and Fayt is reunited with Sophia. While on the station, they are confronted by an angelic-looking Executioner that calls itself Proclaimer. It launches itself to attack, telling them that they must be destroyed.

Investigation of the Moonbase records reveals the truth behind the Executioners and their appearance. During the charting of a planet called Styx, explorers encountered an extremely advanced and extremely old Time Gate. When activated, it informed them that their forays into the field of symbological genetics had angered the Creator, and that they were to be destroyed. Even if they were to abandon symbological genetics, the reins would be taken up by another soon enough, and that they were not being warned — they were being sentenced.

The explorers beat a hasty retreat and informed the Federation of what they had found. Studies soon suggested that the statement came from another plane of existence; an entirely new universe. Further study revealed that symbology might be used to access this universe. The scientists agreed to use their own offspring; the subjects were Fayt Leingod, Sophia Esteed, and Maria Traydor. Fayt was the son of Robert and Ryoko Leingod, while Sophia was the daughter of Clive Esteed. Maria was an orphan who was later adopted by the fourth member of the team, Jessie Traydor. The three were symbologically altered in such a way that if they worked together, they could gain entry through the Time Gate. Maria was given the power of Alteration, which would allow her and those with her to remain in physical forms in the new world. Fayt was given the power of Destruction, as it was assumed they would need to physically defend themselves. Two years later, the younger Sophia was given the power of Connection - the key ability needed to make contact with 4D space. The Vendeeni had been attacking in hopes of handing over Fayt to the Executioners and staying their wrath.

The party goes to Styx and finds the area flooded with Executioners. Escaping their ship in a small shuttle, they witness the mysterious beings and their awesome might first-hand as the Federation battleship Aquaelie which had escorted them is destroyed. Reaching the Time Gate, the party enters "4D space," a dimension higher than their own. According to the 4D beings, their universe is actually not real in relation to 4D space; rather, it is a computer simulation developed by Luther Lansfeld, the owner of the Sphere Company. Dubbed the "Eternal Sphere", it is similar to a real-world massively multiplayer online game for the inhabitants of 4D space.
 
Fayt and his allies learn that the Executioners are anti-viruses sent to delete anomalies in the Milky Way section of the Eternal Sphere. With the help of Blair Lansfeld, programmer and sister to Luther, the party manages to find Luther. Blair and the group believe that the residents of the Eternal Sphere have managed to achieve a level of intelligence equal to that of 4D citizens; Luther, however, considers them "mere data", and in a rage decides to delete the entire Eternal Sphere. The party fights and defeats him, causing him to be deleted himself, but fails to stop the deletion. Ultimately the universe is not destroyed, hinted to be due to the combined sentience of its inhabitants willing its continued existence, and now exists independent of 4D space. The party goes their separate ways, with Fayt's "affection" level dictating whether he goes with one of them or goes off on his own.

Development
One of the major influences of the design changes from Star Ocean: The Second Story to Till the End of Time was Star Trek. The combat system was mostly unaltered from the previous title, but characters were rendered in 3D instead of 2D and more strategy was incorporated into the fights. Transitioning to a completely 3D environment from a 2D/3D mix was a lengthy process, and was only possible due to the increased power of the PlayStation 2 console. In terms of story message, game producer Yoshinori Yamagishi stated that the main message the game communicates is one of "trust". Several characters and dungeons did not make the cut for the final version of the game, but most of what developers wanted found its way into the game. Gameplay balance was adjusted between the Japanese and American releases, as well as fixing various technical errors that occurred in the original Japanese release.

Soundtrack
The music for this game was composed by Motoi Sakuraba, a long-time collaborator with tri-Ace. The soundtrack was eventually released in four parts:
 Original Soundtrack Volume 1 - A 2-CD set containing mainly the softer and orchestral pieces from the game.
 Original Soundtrack Volume 2 - Another 2-CD set containing the upbeat music, primarily the battle and dungeon themes.
 Arrange Album - A selection of tracks from the game reworked in different styles.
 Voice Mix - Similar to the Arrange Album, but featuring dialogue sampled from the Japanese version of the game along with the music.

The limited edition of Volume 1 also came with a box to hold all four albums.

When the game was revised into the Director's Cut, Sakuraba composed a few new pieces of music and released an album for them.

The song "The Small Bird That Forgot How To Fly" (飛び方を忘れた小さな鳥, Tobikata Wo Wasureta Chiisana Tori) by the JPop singer Misia was used to accompany the game's ending credits.

Reception

Initially, the game received a somewhat negative impression in Japan. Parts of the game were alleged to be buggy, and the game refused to work at all in older SCPH-10000 PlayStation 2s. Enix blamed Sony, as they had coded Star Ocean 3 with features from updated libraries that were apparently not backward-compatible.  Sony denied all responsibility. Regardless, it impacted the game's sales, and Enix released the Director's Cut in 2004 to assuage grievances about the original by fixing the bugs and adding features. In North America, the game was initially well received among both critics and players, with GameRankings, a compilation of critical reviews, giving it an average score of 80.99%. Star Ocean 3 was the 96th-best seller among console games of the PS2/GameCube/Xbox generation as of July 2006; it had estimated U.S. sales of 630,000 copies, with revenues of $23 million. In Japan, the original release sold 533,373 in 2003, while the Director's Cut sold 207,881 copies between 2004 and 2009, bringing worldwide sales to 1,371,254 units. IGN placed Till the End of Time at number 58 on their "Top 100 PlayStation 2 Games" list.

Notes

References

External links

 
  (Director's Cut)
 Star Ocean: Till the End of Time at GameFAQs
 

2003 video games
Action role-playing video games
Enix games
Multiplayer and single-player video games
PlayStation 2 games
PlayStation 2-only games
Space opera video games
Square Enix games
Till the End of Time
Tri-Ace
Tri-Crescendo games
Video games scored by Motoi Sakuraba
Video games developed in Japan
Video games set on fictional planets
Video games with alternate endings
Video games about virtual reality
Simulated reality in fiction
Video games set in the 29th century
Science fantasy video games
Works about vacationing